WLCL (93.9 FM) is an American radio station licensed to Sellersburg, Indiana, United States, serving the Louisville, Kentucky area. The station is owned by Union Broadcasting.

History
The station was licensed as WZZB on February 1, 1990. On May 24, 1991, the station's license was deleted (DWZZB) but it was later relicensed as WQKC.

WQKC changed its sports format to classic hits on November 20, 2008, after changing its call letters to WLCL. On August 2, 2010, WLCL and WQKC went silent after Cumulus decided to cease operations in the Louisville market.

In 2011, the station returned to the air as WAYI, carrying the Contemporary Christian format originating with the WAY-FM Network, which ran the station, still under the ownership of Cumulus Media, in a local marketing agreement (LMA).

On April 1, 2014, WAY-FM programming was removed from WAYI. The station went silent on April 25, 2014, and returned to previous call letters WLCL on May 1, 2014.

It was announced in late 2014 that Union Broadcasting, which also owns sports radio stations WHBE (AM) and WHBE-FM in the Louisville market, would purchase WLCL from Cumulus Media. WLCL resumed operations on January 14, 2015, broadcasting ESPN Radio full-time. The purchase by Union Broadcasting closed on January 21, 2015, at a price of $3.138 million. The station became a radio affiliate of the Baltimore Ravens beginning with the 2019 season, allowing Louisville Cardinals football fans to follow the National Football League exploits of Lamar Jackson.

On February 17, 2022, it was announced that Louisville First Media Group, a partnership between the operators of WLCL and Word Media Group's WGTK, had struck a broadcast rights deal, wherein the two stations would replace their longtime radio homes of WHAS and WKRD as the official home for University of Louisville Cardinals athletics. The two stations will carry all of the university's football, men’s and women’s basketball, and baseball games in addition to seasonal football and basketball coaches shows. The daily “Cardinal Insider” show, a show checking in on daily news from the teams, which is currently heard from 6-7pm weekdays on WKRD, will also move to WLCL, WGTK and Word Media Group's WXVW/W241CK in the nearby Indiana town of Jeffersonville. The change came, despite a decades-long partnership with WHAS, as a result of the university becoming upset with iHeartMedia frequently preempting Cardinals athletics broadcasts in favor of in-state rivals, the University of Kentucky Wildcats; in addition, since the launch of the format on WLCL, the station had already frequently played up the local connection to the university, even including the university's mascot in their logo.

References

External links

LCL
LCL
Radio stations established in 1990